The Namco System 22 is the successor to the Namco System 21 arcade system board. It debuted in 1992 with Sim Drive in Japan, followed by a worldwide debut in 1993 with Ridge Racer.

The System 22 was designed by Namco with assistance from graphics & simulation company Evans & Sutherland. Graphical features include texture mapping, Gouraud shading,  transparency effects, and depth cueing, thanks to the Evans & Sutherland 'TR3' chip/chipset,  
which stands for: Texture Mapping, Real-Time, Real-Visual, Rendering System. The main CPU provides a scene description to the TR3 graphics processing unit and a bank of DSP chips which perform 3D calculations.

A variant of the system, called the Super System 22, was released in 1995. The hardware was largely similar to the System 22, but with a slightly higher polygon rate and more special effects possible.

System 22 Specifications

Main CPU: Motorola 68020 32-bit @ 24.576 MHz
DSP: 2x Texas Instruments TMS32025 @ 49.152 MHz (exact number of DSPs may vary)
GPU: Evans & Sutherland TR3 (Texture Mapping, Real-Time, Real-Visual, Rendering System)
Features: Texture mapping, Gouraud shading,  transparency effects, depth cueing, 16.7 million colors, 240,000 polygons/second
Sound CPU: Mitsubishi M37702 (System 22 Games) or M37710 (Super System 22 Games) @ 16.384 MHz
Sound Chip: Namco C352 (32 voices, 4 channels @ 16-bit, support for 8-bit linear or μ-law PCM samples)
 + Namco Custom Chips

List of System 22 / Super System 22 Games

Sim Drive (1992, limited release)
Ridge Racer (1993)
Ace Driver (1994)
Alpine Racer (1994)
Cyber Commando (1994)
Ridge Racer 2 (1994)
Ace Driver: Victory Lap (1995)
Air Combat 22 (1995)
Cyber Cycles (1995)
Dirt Dash (1995)
Rave Racer (1995)
Time Crisis (1995)
Tokyo Wars (1996)
Alpine Racer 2 (1996)
Alpine Surfer (1996)
Aqua Jet (1996)
Armadillo Racing (1996)
Prop Cycle (1996)

References

External links
System 22 at System16 - The Arcade Museum

Namco arcade system boards